Keeping Canada Alive is a Canadian television documentary series, which premiered October 4, 2015 on CBC Television.

Narrated by Kiefer Sutherland, the six-episode series provides a view of Canada's health care system. Over a 24-hour period in May 2015, production crews in 24 cities across Canada filmed the inner workings of hospitals and other medical facilities. In addition to the six televised episodes, additional footage is available from the program's website.

References

External links

2015 Canadian television series debuts
CBC Television original programming
Television series by Force Four Entertainment
2010s Canadian medical television series
2010s Canadian documentary television series